Karl Friedrich, Prince of Hohenzollern (given names: Karl Friedrich Emich Meinrad Benedikt Fidelis Maria Michael Gerold; born 20 April 1952) is the eldest son of the late Friedrich Wilhelm, Prince of Hohenzollern and Princess Margarita of Leiningen. He became head of the Roman Catholic Swabian branch of the House of Hohenzollern upon his father's death on 16 September 2010.

Education and career
Karl Friedrich is said to have attended the Institut auf dem Rosenberg for his secondary education. He studied business administration at the University of Fribourg, Switzerland.

He is the chairman and sole owner of Unternehmensgruppe Fürst von Hohenzollern (Corporate Group Prince of Hohenzollern), including real estate and forests with 400 employees, and owns a 50% share in the Zollern GmbH und Co. KG (steelworks, transmission technics) with 2800 employees. The Prince himself is voice, saxophonist and leader of the music band Royal Groovin'.

He has been a member of the Advisory Board of Südwestbank, a member of the Advisory Board of Landesbank Baden-Württemberg (LBBW) since 2007 and a member of the Southwest Regional Advisory Board of Commerzbank since 2008.

According to the suspended 1938 Constitution of Romania, Karl Friedrich is heir to the throne since 2017, upon the death of former King Michael. However, in a 2009 interview, he stated that he had no interest in the defunct Romanian throne.

Marriage and children

Karl Friedrich married Countess Alexandra Schenk  von Stauffenberg on 17 May 1985 in the Beuron Archabbey, Baden-Württemberg. They were divorced on 21 January 2010, in Sigmaringen. They have four children:
Alexander Friedrich Antonius Johannes, Hereditary Prince of Hohenzollern (b. 16 March 1987) married in November 2021 American-born Michelle Vincentia Keith 
Princess Philippa Marie Carolina Isabelle of Hohenzollern (b. 2 November 1988)
Princess Flaminia Pia Eilika Stephanie of Hohenzollern (b. 9 January 1992), married Baron Károly von Stipsicz de Ternova (b. 13 June 1990) on 26 June 2021 at Sigmaringen Castle
Princess Antonia Elisabeth Georgina Tatiana of Hohenzollern (b. 22 June 1995)

On 17 July 2010, Karl Friedrich married for the second time with Katharina Maria "Nina" de Zomer (born 1959).

Residences
Karl Friedrich lives on his hunting estate Josefslust House, whereas the nearby hunting lodge is used by his brother Albrecht (born 1954) and the nearby Krauchenwies estate by his ex-wife, Princess Alexandra. Furthermore, he owns Umkirch Castle and, as head of the princely Sigmaringen branch of the house of Hohenzollern, has a one-third ownership share in Hohenzollern Castle, together with the head of the royal branch, Georg Friedrich, Prince of Prussia.

He has his offices at Sigmaringen Castle which is also open to the public and is used for family weddings and other ceremonial occasions.

Titles and styles
Present: His Highness Karl Friedrich Prince of Hohenzollern

Ancestry

Discography
 Jive and Candies (2003, Charly and the Jivemates)
 Jump for Joy (2007, Charly and the Jivemates)
 Just Friends (2010, with Frieder Berlin Trio)

References

External links
Hohenzollern website

1952 births
Living people
House of Hohenzollern-Sigmaringen
People from Sigmaringen
Princes of Hohenzollern-Sigmaringen
German landowners
Institut auf dem Rosenberg alumni